John Williamson in Symphony is a live album by Australian country music artist John Williamson with the Sydney Symphony conducted by Guy Noble. The album was recorded at the Sydney Opera House in October 2010, two days after being inducted into the ARIA Hall of Fame. Directly after the concert, Mark Poston, Chairman of EMI Australia presented Williamson with a plaque showing all thirty-five of his EMI album covers from his forty year career. The plaque reads: "Presented to John Williamson in recognition of 40 Years 'True Blue'. This plaque is awarded in tribute to four decades of great stories and songs ... and making Australia a better place. With respect and best wishes from all your mates at EMI Australia."

The album was released in January 2011 and was certified platinum in 2013.

Track listing

The DVD includes bonus features including the presentation to Williamson of "40 Years 'True Blue' ", interviews with industry and family members, and out-takes.

Charts

Certifications

Release history

References

2011 live albums
John Williamson (singer) albums
Warner Music Group live albums
Live albums by Australian artists